Tasty n Alder was a restaurant in Portland, Oregon, United States. The business opened in 2013 and closed in 2020, during the COVID-19 pandemic.

History
The steakhouse opened in 2013.

Tasty n Alder closed in 2020, during the COVID-19 pandemic, replaced by the Korean restaurant Toki.

Reception
In 2013, The Oregonian David Sarasohn gave the restaurant an 'A−' rating.

See also

 Impact of the COVID-19 pandemic on the restaurant industry in the United States
 List of defunct restaurants of the United States

References

External links

 
 Tasty n Alder at Food Network
 Tasty n Alder at Portland Monthly

2013 establishments in Oregon
2020 disestablishments in Oregon
Defunct restaurants in Portland, Oregon
Defunct steakhouses in Oregon
Restaurants disestablished during the COVID-19 pandemic
Restaurants disestablished in 2020
Restaurants established in 2013
Southwest Portland, Oregon
Steakhouses in Portland, Oregon